Victor Fedorovitch Winberg (16 June 1832 – unattested date) was an Imperial Russian division commander. He was the father of Fyodor Viktorovich Vinberg. He participated in the suppression of the 1863 uprising in Poland as well as the war against the Ottoman Empire.

Sources

External links
 
 Биография на сайте «Русская императорская армия»

Russian people of the January Uprising
Russian military personnel of the Russo-Turkish War (1877–1878)
1832 births
Year of death missing